Bradley "Brad" Snyder (born January 8, 1976) is a Canadian retired shot putter, whose personal best throw is 20.87 metres, achieved in June 2004 in Atlanta.

Born in Windsor, Ontario, Snyder earned a full-ride scholarship at the University of South Carolina from 1995 to 1999 and was a dominant force in collegiate athletics.  Snyder never lost a Southeastern Conference championship.  He was the school's first athlete to win eight SEC titles and was an all-American in seven-of-eight seasons (indoor and outdoor).  In 1998, he won all 19 meets and was the SEC track and field athlete of the year and was later inducted into the school's sports hall of fame.  He competed in three Olympics and retired after the 2004 season.

International competitions

References

External links
 
 
 

1976 births
Living people
Canadian male shot putters
Athletes (track and field) at the 1999 Pan American Games
Athletes (track and field) at the 2003 Pan American Games
Athletes (track and field) at the 2002 Commonwealth Games
Athletes (track and field) at the 1996 Summer Olympics
Athletes (track and field) at the 2000 Summer Olympics
Athletes (track and field) at the 2004 Summer Olympics
Olympic track and field athletes of Canada
Pan American Games track and field athletes for Canada
South Carolina Gamecocks men's track and field athletes
Sportspeople from Windsor, Ontario
Pan American Games medalists in athletics (track and field)
Pan American Games bronze medalists for Canada
Competitors at the 1998 Goodwill Games
Medalists at the 1999 Pan American Games
Medalists at the 2003 Pan American Games
Commonwealth Games competitors for Canada
20th-century Canadian people
21st-century Canadian people